Shotokuvirae is a kingdom of viruses.

Nomenclature
The kingdom, Shotokuvirae, was named after Japan's Empress Shotoku (718-770 AD), who reigned over Japan twice, first as Empress Koken and later as Empress Shotoku, and who created the world's earliest written record of a plant virus disease, which was a poem to her followers about a geminivirus eupatorium yellow vein virus infection of a eupatorium plant, which she had described as having turned yellow.

Taxonomy
The following phyla are recognized:
Cossaviricota
Cressdnaviricota

References

Viruses